The 1985–86 Kent Football League season was the 20th in the history of the Kent Football League, a football competition in England.

The league was won by Alma Swanley but the club was not promoted to the Southern Football League.

League table

The league featured 17 clubs which competed in the previous season, along with one new club:
Thames Polytechnic, transferred from the London Spartan League

League table

References

External links

1985-86
1985–86 in English football leagues